Zaozerye is a rural locality (a village) in Tregubovskoye Rural Settlement, Velikoustyugsky District, Vologda Oblast, Russia. The population was 14 as of 2002.

Geography 
Zaozerye is located 11 km southwest of Veliky Ustyug (the district's administrative centre) by road. Belozerovo is the nearest rural locality.

References 

Rural localities in Velikoustyugsky District